The German-speaking part of Switzerland comprises about 65 percent of Switzerland (North Western Switzerland, Eastern Switzerland, Central Switzerland, most of the Swiss Plateau and the greater part of the Swiss Alps).

The variety of the German language spoken in Switzerland is called Swiss German which refers to any of the Alemannic dialects and which are divided into Low, High and Highest Alemannic. The only exception within German-speaking Switzerland is the municipality of Samnaun where an Austro-Bavarian dialect is spoken.

German is the sole official language in 17 Swiss cantons (Aargau, Appenzell Ausserrhoden, Appenzell Innerrhoden, Basel-Stadt, Basel-Landschaft, Glarus, Lucerne, Nidwalden, Obwalden, Schaffhausen, Schwyz, Solothurn, St. Gallen, Thurgau, Uri, Zug, and Zurich). French and German are co-official in 3 cantons (Bern, Fribourg, and Valais). In the trilingual canton of Graubünden, more than half the population speaks German, while most of the rest speak one of the other official languages, Romansh and Italian.

While the French-speaking Swiss prefer to call themselves Romands and their part of the country la Romandie, the German-speaking Swiss used to refer to (and, colloquially, still do) the French-speaking Swiss as "Welsche", and to their area as Welschland, which has the same etymology as the English Welsh (see Walha). In Germany Welsch and Welschland refer to Italy; there, the term is antiquated, rarely used, and somewhat disparaging.

By the Middle Ages, a marked difference had developed between the rural cantons of the German-speaking part of Switzerland and the city cantons, divided by views about trade and commerce. After the Reformation, all cantons were either Catholic or Protestant, and the denominational influences on culture added to the differences. Even today, where all cantons are somewhat denominationally mixed, the different historical denominations can be seen in the mountain villages, where Roman Catholic Central Switzerland abounds with chapels and statues of saints, and the farm houses in the very similar landscape of the Protestant Bernese Oberland show Bible verses carved on the housefronts, instead.

See also
German-speaking Europe
Languages of Switzerland
Swiss German
Swiss Standard German

References 

Subdivisions of Switzerland
Regions of Switzerland
Languages of Switzerland
Switzerland